This is a list of television programs which are currently, formerly, or are soon to be broadcast on Armenia TV and Armenia Premium.

Current programming of Armenia TV

News and information
 News Hour
 Sharp Angle (2012-present)
 Sharp Angle: Special Incidents (2014-present)

Dramas
 Flight (2016-present) 
 What Name Shall I Give This Love? 2 (2017-present)
 Pomegranate Seed (2017-present) 
 Brothers (2017, repetition)

Sitcoms
 Domino (2015-present)

Game shows
 3/OFF (2017-present)

Reality/other
 What? Where? When? (2002-present)
 The Voice of Armenia (2012-present)
 R-Evolution (2013-present)
 Comments (2014-present)
 Nane (2014-present)
 Duty Section (2014-present)
 01-99 (2014-present)
 Prescription (2017-present)
 Post Factum (2017-present)
 Formula Club (2017-present)
 Broadcast Queen (2017-present)

Former/reran programming of Armenia TV
 Kargin Haghordum (2002-2009)
 Super Duet (2006)
 National Star (2007)
 32 Teeth Club (2009-2013)
 Yere1 (2009-2014)
 Our Alphabet (2009)
 Fort Boyard (2009)
 Kargin Serial (2010-2013)
 Our Yard (2010)
 What Name Shall I Give This Love? (2011-2012)
 Tnpesa (2013-2015)
 Own Enemy (2013-2015)
 Brainiest (2014-2019)
 Full House (2014-2019)
 The Leaders (2015-2017)
 The Azizyans (2017-2020)
 Crime and Punishment
 Armenian's eyes
 Armenians by Origin

Special Current programming of Armenia Premium

Dramas
 Countdown (2017-present)

Children's programming
 Children of the Orchestra (2017-present)

Comedy shows
 Stand Up (2016-present)

Sitcoms
 Golden School (2017-present)

Special Former/reran programming of Armenia Premium
 Change (2016-2017)
 Ancient Kings (2016-2017)
 The Desirable Groom (2016-2017)
 The Azizyans (2016-2020)
 The Million in a Trap (2017)
 To a Dream (2017)
 To the Landing (2017)
 Purgatory (2017)
 The Deer Path (2017)
 Bought Happiness (2017)

References

External links

Armenia TV